Waco: The Rules of Engagement is a 1997 documentary directed by William Gazecki about the 1993 Waco siege, a 51-day standoff beginning with the February 28 Bureau of Alcohol, Tobacco and Firearms assault on the Branch Davidian church and home outside of Waco, Texas, and ending with the April 19 Federal Bureau of Investigation assault on the building. Following the assault, the building caught fire, killing the remaining inhabitants.

Production
The film was spearheaded by gun rights activist turned filmmaker Michael McNulty, who spent twenty-eight months and $400,000 developing the film. Later former CNN business news reporter Dan Gifford and his wife Amy Sommer Gifford came in as co-producers, supplying almost another one million dollars. Director William Gazecki joined McNulty in traveling the country to interview and film participants for the film.

Summary
The resultant film, with Dan Gifford narrating, combined FBI negotiation tapes, Davidian home videos, footage from Congressional hearings on Waco, and extensive interviews with Davidian survivors, representatives of law enforcement, independent investigators, scholars and scientists. The film painted a dark picture of law enforcement actions, accusing FBI agents of shooting into the building at Davidians on April 19.

Reception
The film was unveiled at the Sundance Film Festival in January 1997. In that year it won a News & Documentary Emmy Award for Outstanding Investigative Journalism and was nominated for an Academy Award for Best Documentary Feature.

Because of a falling out between Michael McNulty and Dan and Amy Gifford, different cuts of this documentary have been produced. The version available today on video is a 135-minute cut. Michael McNulty would go on to make Waco: A New Revelation released in 1999 and The F.L.I.R. Project released in 2001.

References

External links

1997 films
1997 documentary films
1990s English-language films
Films set in 1993
American documentary films
Waco siege
1990s American films